C++Builder is a rapid application development (RAD) environment, originally developed by Borland and  owned by Embarcadero Technologies (a subsidiary of Idera), for writing programs in the C++ programming language currently targeting Windows (both IA-32 and x64), iOS and for several releases, macOS and Android   (still supported, but only Android 32-bit apps.) C++Builder combines the Visual Component Library and IDE written in Object Pascal with multiple C++ compilers. Most components developed in Delphi can be used in C++Builder with no or little modification, although the reverse is not true, but this constraint is valid only for source code. 
Binary code generated by Delphi can easily be linked to binary code generated by C++Builder and vice versa to generate an executable written in both Object Pascal and C++. 
With this approach, C++ can be called from Object Pascal and vice versa. Since both Delphi and C++ use the same back end linker, the debugger can single step from Delphi code into C++ transparently.

C++Builder includes tools that allow drag-and-drop visual development, making programming easier by incorporating a WYSIWYG graphical user interface builder.

Technology 
C++Builder uses the same IDE as Delphi, and shares many core libraries.  Notable shared Delphi (Object Pascal code) and C++ Builder routines include the FastMM4 memory manager, which was developed as a community effort within the FastCode project, the entire UI framework known as the VCL, which is written in Object Pascal, as well as base system routines, many of which have been optimised for both Delphi and C++Builder through the FastCode project.

C++Builder projects can include Delphi code. The Delphi compiler emits C++ headers, allowing C++ code to link to Delphi classes and methods as though they were written in C++. The reverse (C++ code being used by Delphi) is not as straightforward but possible.

History

Borland C++Builder
C++Builder originally targeted only the Microsoft Windows platform. Later versions incorporated Borland CLX, a cross-platform development visual component library based on Qt, that supports Windows and Linux, however CLX is now abandoned. The current version by Embarcadero supports cross-platform development using the new Firemonkey (FMX) library.

Traditionally, the release cycle was such that Delphi got major enhancements first, with C++Builder following, though recent versions have been released at the same time as their Delphi equivalents.

C++Builder 1.0
The preview edition was announced in Jan. 7, 1997. Retail version was released on February 26, 1997. Original Borland C++Builder editions include Client/Server Suite, Professional, Standard.

BCB3
To align version number with Borland® Delphi®, version 2 was skipped.

Borland C++Builder 4
New features include:
Integrated Inprise Corporation's VisiBroker 3.3 with event and naming services
New multi-standard flexible C++ compiler
Support for the latest ANSI/ISO C++ language specifications, including a host of compiler enhancements including Dynamic Compilation and Adaptive Compiler Technology (ACT), which radically speed compiler build processes; full ANSI/ISO template implementation; full ANSI/ISO STL (standard template library) support; and a high-performance 32-bit ANSI C++ native code compiler.
Fully customizable AppBrowser IDE
Latest support for Windows 98, 95, and NT including multiple monitors, common controls, docking forms and toolbars, and more.
New Code and Parameter completion, and the new ClassExplorer live structured class view and member creation wizards.
Exclusive C++ debugging tools, including remote debugging for distributed development (COM and CORBA); multi-process and cross-process debugging with debug inspectors, dynamic watch windows, and debug tooltips.
Internet tools, including ActiveForms for building Web browser C++ applications and WebBroker for building CGI, WinCGI, ISAPI, and NSAPI C++ applications and over 25 Internet protocol components for instantly adding HTTP, FTP, SMTP, POP, NNTP, HTML, and TCP/IP support to any C++ application.
Multi-Tier Database Development Services (MIDAS) Development Kit, including MIDAS 2.
Support for industry standards, including Oracle Corporation's Oracle8i database server; Microsoft Corporation's Microsoft Foundation Classes (MFC), Microsoft Active Template Library (ATL), Microsoft SQL Server 7 and MTS (Microsoft Transaction Server); and Inprise Corporation's Object Windows Library (OWL) and Visual Component Library (VCL).
EZ-COM, which simplifies C++ COM client development and One-Step ActiveX Control creation with new Data Binding support.

Borland C++Builder 5
On March 22, 2000, Inprise Corporation announced the release of Borland C++Builder 5, available in Enterprise, Professional, Standard editions. New features include:
Support of Windows 2000.
Internet Express
XML and HTML4 Support for Full-featured Dynamic Clients
Active Server Objects for the Microsoft Internet Platform
TeamSource

Borland C++Builder 6 (Studio)
On February 5, 2002, Borland Software Corporation announced the release of Borland C++Builder 6 on February 8, 2002, including C++Builder 6 Enterprise, C++Builder 6 Professional, and C++Builder 6 Personal editions. 60-day free trial download of C++Builder 6 Enterprise was also planned. New features include:

Support of Windows XP
BizSnap e-business development platform with Web Services
WebSnap Web application development platform
Borland CLX component library (Professional/Enterprise)
dbExpress (Professional/Enterprise), Enterprise edition adds DB2/Informix/Oracle dbExpress drivers
NetCLX WebBroker WebBroker-compatible cross-platform Web application development framework for Windows and Linux (Professional/Enterprise)
MyBase XML data briefcases (Professional/Enterprise)
Borland C++ Compiler 5.5

Minimum supported operating system was changed to Windows 98.

C++Builder 2006
On Oct 10, 2005, Borland Software Corporation announced the release of Borland C++Builder (previously codenamed "DeXter"). Minimum supported operating system was changed to Windows 2000.

About a year after the announcement Borland released Borland Developer Studio 2006 which includes Borland C++Builder 2006 that provides improved configuration management and bug fixes. Borland Developer Studio 2006 is a single package containing Delphi, C++Builder, and C#Builder.

In 2006 Borland's Developer Tools Group, developers of C++Builder, was transferred to a wholly owned subsidiary, CodeGear.

Borland C++BuilderX
On Sep 15, 2003, Borland Software Corporation announced the release of Borland C++BuilderX (CBX), which was also included as part of the latest Borland Enterprise Studio for Mobile. CBX was written using the same framework as JBuilder and bore little resemblance to either C++Builder or Delphi. This product was aimed at developing large programs for enterprises, but did not sell well.

On Sep 22, 2003, Borland Software Corporation and PalmSource, Inc. announced Borland has licensed the PalmSource software development kits (SDKs) and will support Palm OS development in the Borland C++BuilderX Integrated Development Environment (IDE) and latest Borland Application Lifecycle Management (ALM) solutions for C++.

At the end of 2004 Borland announced that it would continue to develop the earlier C++Builder and bundle it with the Delphi development suite, abandoning C++BuilderX.

CodeGear Borland C++Builder
June 5, 2007, CodeGear released C++Builder 2007, providing:
 Full API support for Microsoft Vista including themed applications and seamless VCL support for Aero and Vista Desktop
 Increased ANSI C++ conformance
 Up to 500% faster in-IDE build performance
 Support for MSBuild, DBX4 database architecture, and "VCL for the Web" which supports Ajax
 IDE, debugger, dbExpress, and VCL component improvements

CodeGear RAD Studio 2007 incorporates C++Builder 2007 and Delphi. Also in 2007 Borland revived the "Turbo" brand and released two "Turbo" editions of C++Builder: Turbo C++ Professional, and Turbo C++ Explorer (no longer available from CodeGear), based on Borland C++Builder 2006.

In 2008 CodeGear was purchased by Embarcadero Technologies, who continued development.

Embarcadero C++Builder
After purchasing CodeGear, Embarcadero Technologies bundled C++Builder with Delphi and other tools and released them as RAD Studio. This article will reference C++Builder by the RAD Studio release nomenclature.

C++Builder 2009
Released August 25, 2008, C++Builder 2009 improved with:
 Full Unicode support throughout VCL and RTL
 Early adoption of the C++0x standard
 Full ITE (Integrated Translation Environment) support
 Native Ribbon components
 Inclusion of the Boost library. 
 VCL and RTL enhancements
 New DataSnap library for database applications.

C++Builder 2010 followed August 24, 2009, adding
 Touch and gesture support for VCL components
 C++ specific class explorer
 Code completion improvements
 IDE updates

Embarcadero moved to a different versioning scheme in 2010. Rather than using edition numbers, they sequenced with the prefix 'XE'.

C++Builder XE
C++Builder XE was released August 30, 2010 and included:
 Multiple C++ language updates
 New C++ compiler options
 Multiple user-requested fixes

C++Builder XE2
C++Builder XE2 was released August 31, 2011 and included:
 New 'FireMonkey' library for creating cross-platform GUIs (Windows, macOS, iOS)
 dbExpress to deliver new connectivity options with support for InterBase XE, FireBird 2.5, SQL Anywhere 12 and ODBC
 DataSnap mobile support for iOS, Android, Blackberry, and Windows Phone 
 Expanded cloud computing integration with new data and deployment options to Amazon EC2 and Microsoft Windows Azure
 LiveBindings for VCL and FireMonkey components
 Multiple new reporting tools

C++Builder XE3
C++Builder XE3 was released September 4, 2012 and added:
 Windows 8 Style UI
 Enhanced native UI control styling
 3rd party Pro-Designer UI Styles
 Support for Mac OS X Mountain Lion & Retina
 Project templates
 Touch and Live Tile support
 1-click conversion for existing apps
 Audio/Video Multimedia controls
 Simple “Draw to bind” data and properties between objects
 Quick app prototyping
 Organize bindings with Layers

C++Builder XE4
C++Builder XE4 was released April 22, 2013, and included:
 64-bit Windows compiler based on Clang 3.1. The 32-bit compiler was still based on Embarcadero's older technology.
 FireDAC library for database access
 Many new FireMonkey components and updates
 Mobile Form Designer

C++Builder XE5
C++Builder XE5 was released September 11, 2013, and included:
 Time Picker control for Windows and OS X
 Built-in search filtering for TListView on Windows and OS X
 FM Platform performance optimizations
 Professional edition includes expanded FireDAC support for local databases, including Microsoft Access database, SQLite database, InterBase ToGo / IBLite, InterBase on localhost, MySQL Embedded, MySQL Server on localhost, Advantage Database local engine, PostgreSQL on localhost, Firebird Embedded, and Firebird on localhost
 FireDAC integrated into the C++Builder install for Professional, Enterprise, Ultimate and Architect editions
 REST Client support for simplified invocation of REST services
 Authorization support including Basic Authentication, Plan Authentication, OAuth1, OAuth2
 TRestClient, TRestRequest, and TRestResponse components
 REST Debugger tool for testing REST calls and their parameters
C++Builder XE5 Starter Edition includes:
 Develop 32-bit Windows application using the C++Builder VCL and FireMonkey application platform
 IDE and visual development environment
 Hundreds of included components
 License for use until user's individual revenue from C++Builder applications or company revenue reaches $1,000 US or development team expands to more than five developers
Available editions include Architect, Ultimate, Enterprise, Professional, Starter.

C++Builder XE6
Released April 15, 2014, C++Builder XE6 included:
 FireMonkey Android application support
 Support for Windows 64-bit packages
 C++ compiler improvements
 IDE, Deployment Manager, and SDK Manager improvements

C++Builder XE7
Released September 2, 2014, C++Builder XE7 added:
 FireMonkey multi-platform support through "multi-device applications"
 Runtime Library improvements for Bluetooth, parallel programming, XML, and web encoding/decoding
 Enterprise Mobility Services to interface with DataSnap REST APIs and enterprise database data.

 C++Builder XE8
C++Builder XE8, released April 7, 2015, included the following new features:
 GetIt Package Manager updates
 Native iOS Presentation for FireMonkey components
 Desktop web browser component
 Interactive mobile maps
 New media library options
 Mobile app analytics
 New C++ compiler for 64-bit iOS
 Mercurial version control integration
 New DUnitX testing framework

C++Builder 10.0 Seattle
Released August 31, 2015, Seattle updated the IDE with:
 CLANG 3.3 C++ compiler suite with some exceptions
 Windows 10 FireMonkey, CVL, and RTL support
 VCL Windows 10 controls
 New VCL Styles
 Multi-monitor configuration improvements
 Updates to the IDE, debugger, database and cloud libraries, and documentation

C++Builder 10.0.1 Update 1
Released November 2015, Update 1 added:
 FMX Grid control for iOS
 iOS native UI styling
 New FMX feature demos
 Platform support for iOS 10 and macOS Sierra

C++Builder 10.1 Berlin
Released April 20, 2016, Berlin added:
 FireUI App Previews - Lets you preview your FireMonkey application on iOS, Android, OS X and Windows as you are designing the app
 Android API 23 support
 Improved Style Designer
 Address Book for iOS and Android
 DataSnap support for JSON streaming
 FireDAC database improvements
 Improved support for new Azure and AWS APIs
 Runtime Library optimizations
 iOS (32 and 64 bit) and Android debuggers

C++Builder 10.1.1 Update 1
Released September 2016, Update 1 added:
 iOS native styling for TGrid
 FMX ListView Item Designer and search filter
 iOS 10 and macOS Sierra support

C++Builder 10.1.2 Update 2
Released December 2016, Update 2 added:
 Windows Desktop Bridge deployment support
 VCL QuickEdits
 New Windows 10 styles
 Improved GetIt package manager

C++Builder 10.2 Tokyo
Released March 22, 2017, Tokyo included:
 Better support for debugging
 Better Codegen in Clang-enhanced compilers
 C++ Android applications can be built without requiring specific versions of the NDK
 Linker utilizing up to 4GiB of memory
 Improved exception handling
 Improved app tethering
 iOS and macOS debugger enhancements
 High DPI fixes for VCL components

C++Builder 10.2.1 Update 1
Released August 2017, Update 1 added:
 C++ compiler and linker quality fixes
 Support for iOS 10.3 and XCode 8.3.3 when targeting the iOS App Store
 Runtime Library and VCL enhancements
 Android control rendering enhancements

C++Builder 10.2.2 Update 2
Released December 2017, Update 2 added:
 FireMonkey QuickEdits
 New VCL controls
 Updated IDE look and feel
 iPhone 11 and X support

C++Builder 10.2.3 Update 3
Released March 2018, Update 3 provided quality improvements and fixes for:
 iOS 11.3 support
 CodeInsight
 C++ compiler 4k stack allocation
 Context help
 Android push notification

C++Builder 10.3 Rio
C++Builder 10.3 was released November 21, 2018 with new features:
 C++17 Support
 Improved code completion
 Improved math performance for C++ functions
 Error Insight preview of code issues
 New libraries through the GetIt package manager
 Improved IDE, dark theme
 VCL High DPI component support
 TWindowsStore component
 Support for Android API 26
 Android Z-Order, native controls, and new permissions model
 iOS 12 support
 Multiple database improvements
 Improved REST architecture
 Improved Azure and AWS S3 support

C++Builder 10.3.1 Update 1
Released February 2019, Update 1 added:
 Expanded support for iOS12 and iPhone X
 HTTP and SOAP Client Library enhancements for Windows
 Bookmarks and Navigator IDE productivity tools
 15 custom VCL and FMX styles
 Compiler improvements and bugfixes

C++Builder 10.3.2 Update 2
Released July 2019, Update 2 added:
 C++17 support for Windows 64-bit
 Improved Code Insight and Code Completion
 Updates to the Android Firebase push notification support
 Run Time Library optimizations
 VCL, FMX, and IDE quality improvements

C++Builder 10.3.3 Update 3
Released November 2019, Update 3 provided numerous quality enhancements and bug fixes for:
 C++ RTL and compiler
 IDE, iOS/Android compatibility
 FireDAC and Database tools
 Web clients
 Debugger

C++Builder 10.4 Sydney
Released May 26, 2020, Sydney improved the product by adding:
 Unified memory management
 Expanded C++ library support
 Windows 64-bit debugging and linking improvements
 New VCL Styles and control styling for high-DPI monitors
 Metal driver GPU support for macOS and iOS
 Enhanced parallel programming library support
 Improved LiveBindings performance

C++Builder 10.4.1 Update 1
Released September 2020, Update 1 added:
 Quality improvements to IDE, C++ Toolchain, FMX, VCL, and other libraries
 Improved support for multi-monitor desktop layouts
 Windows 64-bit debugger and linker enhancements

C++Builder 10.4.2 Update 2
Released February 2021, Update 2 added:
 Advertising component for iOS, including AdMob support based on the Google Firebase SDK
 VCL TControlList control, a flexible and virtualized list control, designed as a high-performance control for very long lists and a modern look and feel
 VCL TNumberBox control, a modern-looking numeric input control, for integer, floating point numbers, and currency values
 Updated Konopka Signature VCL Controls (over 200 additional Windows UI controls), available for download in the GetIt Package Manager

C++Builder 11 Alexandria
C++Builder 11 was released September 10, 2021.

C++Builder 11.1 Update 1

On March 15, 2022, Embarcadero released RAD Studio 11.1 with new features including:

 Many IDE Improvements
 Extensive High DPI IDE quality, plus improved use of the IDE with Remote Desktop 
 Improvements with High DPI designers for VCL and FireMonkey and the styled VCL form designer
 GetIt Library Manager enhancements
 Code Insight Across Delphi and C++Builder
 The Delphi LSP engine saw big performance improvements
 The Delphi and C++ compilers for the various platforms were improved in terms of stability and performance
 Improved RTL, UI, and Database Libraries

C++Builder 11.1.5 C++ Code Insight Update

On July 14, 2022, Embarcadero released C++Builder 11.1.5 C++ Code Insight Update with a number of improvements and quality fixes for C++ developers using C++Builder 11.1 by adding:

 New handling multiple navigation destinations
 New delayed indexing to reduce CPU usage
 New third option for LSP Code Insight 
 Performance improvements
 Improvements display of code completion results
 Improved navigation
 An issue for users of the classic compiler
 Issues saving all files in a project
 More improvements and a variety of quality fixes

Editions 
C++ Builder is available in four editions with increasing features and price:
Community - Available for free for one year but has a limited commercial-use license.  Includes local database connectivity and some library source code.
Professional - adds cross-platform compilation for macOS, (until version 10.2.2: iOS and Android requiring the purchase of the additional Mobile Add-On pack), more library source code, code formatting, and a full commercial license.
Enterprise - includes the mobile target platforms and adds client/server database connectivity, Enterprise Mobility Services, and DataSnap multi-tier SDK. 
Architect - adds data modeling tools.

See also 
Comparison of integrated development environments

References

External links 
Embarcadero Technologies, Inc. C++Builder current version product pages: Full version, Starter edition
C++Builder current version downloads
Embarcadero Technologies, Inc. C++Builder archived pages for prior versions: 2009, 2010, XE, XE2, XE3, XE4
CodeGear from Borland (Borland Software Corporation) C++Builder pages: 2006, 2007, 2007 R2
Borland Software Corporation C++Builder pages: 5, 6, 6 Studio, 2006, C++BuilderX
Inprise Corporation Borland C++Builder pages: 4, 5
Borland International, Inc. C++Builder pages: 1, 3
Download selection of 2010, v5.5, and other versions
C++Builder Developer's Journal 

C++ compilers
C (programming language) compilers
CodeGear software
Integrated development environments
Pascal (programming language) software
User interface builders